Mellunkylä is a neighbourhood in East Helsinki, Finland.
The area of Mellunkylä is 9,9 km2 and it has population of 36,360 (2005).

There are five suburbs in Mellunkylä:
Kontula (Gårdsbacka)
Vesala (Ärvings)
Mellunmäki (Mellungsbacka)
Kivikko (Stensböle)
Kurkimäki (Tranbacka)

Mellunkylä had some suburban settlements already before World War II. In 1960s, Kontula, the largest suburb in Finland was built in record time.

References 

Neighbourhoods of Helsinki